Antonio Venier (c. 1330 – 23 November 1400) was a Doge of Venice, member of the House of Venier, reigning from October 1382 to his death. He was interred in the Basilica di San Giovanni e Paolo, a traditional burial place of the doges. He was married to Agnese da Mosto.

References

14th-century births
14th-century deaths
14th-century Doges of Venice
Antonio
1330s births
1400 deaths
Burials at Santi Giovanni e Paolo, Venice